Margit Korondi (24 June 1932 – 6 March 2022) was a Hungarian gymnast. She competed at the 1952 Summer Olympics in Helsinki, where she received a gold medal in uneven bars, a silver medal in team all-around, and four bronze medals. At the 1956 Summer Olympics in Melbourne, she received a gold medal in team portable apparatus and a silver medal in team all-around.

See also
List of multiple Summer Olympic medalists
List of multiple Olympic medalists at a single Games
List of top Olympic gymnastics medalists
List of Olympic female gymnasts for Hungary

References

External links 
 
 

|-

|-

1932 births
2022 deaths
Hungarian female artistic gymnasts
Gymnasts at the 1952 Summer Olympics
Gymnasts at the 1956 Summer Olympics
Olympic gymnasts of Hungary
Olympic gold medalists for Hungary
Olympic silver medalists for Hungary
Olympic bronze medalists for Hungary
Olympic medalists in gymnastics
Sportspeople from Celje
Medalists at the 1956 Summer Olympics
Medalists at the 1952 Summer Olympics